Boucicaut may refer to:

Persons 
 Jean I Le Maingre ( -1367), called "Boucicaut", Marshal of France
 Jean II Le Maingre (1366-1421), son of Jean I, also called "Boucicaut", Marshal of France
 Geoffrey Boucicaut, son of Jean I, governor of the Dauphiné from 1399 to 1407
 Boucicaut Master, an anonymous French or Flemish miniaturist and illuminator
 Aristide Boucicaut, creator of the French department store Le Bon Marché
 Alexandre Boucicaut, a Haitian football (soccer) player

Other uses 
 Hôpital Boucicaut, a hospital in Paris
 Boucicaut (Paris Métro), a station on line 8 of the Paris Métro